San Cristóbal, (English: Saint Christopher) is the fourth locality of Bogotá, capital of Colombia. It is located in the southeast of Bogota. This district is mostly inhabited by lower class residents.

General information

Borders 
 North: Santa Fe locality
 South: The locality of Usme
 East: The municipality of Ubaque, Cundinamarca
 West: The localities of Los Mártires and Antonio Nariño

Hydrology 
The Fucha River originates from the Eastern Hills in the east of the locality and is known as the San Cristóbal River while forming the locality's border.

Topography 
Bogotá's southeastern corner, including eastern San Cristóbal, rise into the city's Eastern Hills. The western side of the locality on the Bogotá savanna is relatively flat.

Transportation 
The main transit artery is Calle 22 Sur, which is also known as Avenida Primero de Mayo. Other important roads are Calle 11 Sur, the Eastern Highway which connects the municipalities located to Bogotá's southeast, Carrera 10, and the extension of Avenida Circunvalar in the Eastern Hills.

Points of interest 
 Divino Niño (Divine Child) church, located in the Veinte de Julio neighborhood
 San Cristóbal and Gaitán Cortés (Columnas Park) metropolitan parks
 The Entrenubes (between the clouds) natural park
 The Primero de Mayo bike path
 La Victoria community center, which has a pool and cultural center

Neighborhoods 
The neighborhoods of San Cristóbal are:
San Cristóbal, Barcelona, Columnas, Corinto, La Castaña, La Gran Colombia, La María, Montecarlo, Quinta Ramos, San Pedro, Aguas Claras, La Belleza, Buenos Aires, Canadá, El Triángulo, Granada Sur, Juan Rey, La Victoria, Las Mercedes, Los Alpes, Los Libertadores, Malvinas,Miraflores, Nariño Sur, Los Pinares, Quindío, Ramajal, Sagrada Familia, San Blas, San Isidro, San José Sur Oriental, Santa Inés Sur Oriental, Sociego, Suramérica, La Gloria, Veinte de Julio, Villa de los Alpes, Villa Javier, and Vitelma.

References

External links 
  National University of Colombia site about San Cristóbal.
   Document with general data about the locality

Localities of Bogotá